Digging to China is a 1997 American drama film that marked the cinematic directorial debut of actor Timothy Hutton and the screen debut of Evan Rachel Wood. The screenplay by Karen Janszen focuses on the friendship forged between a pre-teen girl with a vivid imagination and a man with mental disabilities.

Plot
Set in the mid-1960s, the story centers on ten-year-old Harriet Frankovitz, a lonely outcast who lives with her mother and older sister Gwen in a dilapidated New Hamsphire motel with cabins shaped like tipis her mother received as part of her divorce settlement. Harriet has a strong desire to escape her dull existence by means of any one of a number of creative ways - a magic carpet she tries to fly off the roof, on board a flying saucer she anxiously awaits in the schoolyard, through a tunnel she has been digging to China, or by attaching helium-filled balloons to a lawn chair. Mrs. Frankovitz is a bitter alcoholic with a propensity for driving on the wrong side of the road, while Gwen has sexual encounters with a series of men in vacant rooms. Terminally ill Leah Schroth is en route to an institution where she plans to admit her intellectually disabled son Ricky when their car breaks down near the motel, and the two stay there while waiting for the vehicle to be repaired. Mrs. Frankovitz is killed in an automobile accident, and Harriet discovers Gwen is her biological mother. The distressed girl and her new friend run away and set up house in an abandoned caboose concealed beneath dense foliage in the woods. When Ricky becomes ill, Harriet is forced to seek medical assistance for him. Once he recovers, his mother sets off with him to complete their interrupted journey, leaving Gwen and Harriet to learn to interact in their new roles of mother and daughter.

Cast
Evan Rachel Wood as Harriet Frankovitz 
Kevin Bacon as Ricky Schroth 
Mary Stuart Masterson as Gwen Frankovitz 
Marian Seldes as Leah Schroth 
Cathy Moriarty as Mrs. Frankovitz
Rob Pattillo as bored student

Production notes
The film was shot in Cherokee, North Carolina. The classroom setting was filmed in Whittier, North Carolina.

The soundtrack includes "One Big Love" by Patty Griffin, "Last Train to Clarksville" by The Monkees, "Mas Que Nada" by Sérgio Mendez and Brazil '66, "Iko Iko" by The Dixie Cups, "Soul Sauce" by Cal Tjader, "Crimson and Clover" by Tommy James and the Shondells, "El Lobo" by Herb Alpert, "Samba Pa Ti" by Carlos Santana, and "Magic Carpet Ride" by Steppenwolf.

The film premiered at the Giffoni Film Festival on July 16, 1997.

Critical reception
In his review in The New York Times, Stephen Holden said the film "doesn't grab at the heartstrings and strum an aggressively mawkish ballad. In fact, it could do with a bit more heart. Part of the problem is Ms. Wood's Harriet. The young actress is radiantly photogenic, but her performance is muted and monochromatic ... Without an incandescent performance at its center, Digging to China follows the same path as Harriet's balloon escape. It gets stuck in the trees."

Peter Stack of the San Francisco Chronicle called it a "cloying, superficial story [that] ends up forced and predictable ... Bacon's portrayal of Ricky, who is disabled by a nerve disease that contorts his body and face, ranges from adequate to almost touching. But it's the desperate, contrived storytelling that makes the film a chore to watch ... [its] saving grace is that it's lush and visually attractive."

In the San Francisco Examiner, Walter Addiego described it as "an uneasy mixture of afterschool special and art-house project" and "well-intentioned but ultimately sentimental" and added, "It nonetheless offers some good performances and nice, low-key observations about the predicament of outsiders ... Considering the material, Hutton should be commended. There's just enough going on in Digging to China to suggest real directorial talent, and I hope he can build on this foundation."

Awards and nominations

See also
 Antipodes

References

External links

1997 films
1990s coming-of-age drama films
1997 independent films
American coming-of-age drama films
Films about children
Films about intellectual disability
Films produced by John Davis
American independent films
Films shot in North Carolina
1997 directorial debut films
1997 drama films
1990s English-language films
1990s American films
Films about disability